Slater is an unincorporated community located in Ballard County, Kentucky, United States.

References

Unincorporated communities in Ballard County, Kentucky
Unincorporated communities in Kentucky